Lajitas is an unincorporated community in Brewster County, Texas, United States, near the Big Bend National Park. According to the Handbook of Texas, the community had a population of 75 in 2010.

History
The settlement is named after the Boquillas flagstone found in the area. "Lajitas" translates to "little flat rocks" in Spanish. It was inhabited by aboriginal Mexicans for many years. They were then removed from the area by the Apache and Comanche tribes in the 18th and 19th centuries. The first white settlers came to the area in the mid-1800s. William H. Emory also visited Lajitas in 1852. The community boomed when quicksilver was discovered 11 miles from the community at the end of the decade. It then became a port of entry when several cattle ranches and mining enterprises appeared in Coahuila and Chihuahua in Mexico and increased commerce across the Rio Grande River. The crossing was described as a smooth, rock bottom, and was best between Del Rio and El Paso. Farming along the floodplain caused an even further boom, causing Lajitas to build a store, a saloon, and a custom house in 1912. The store and saloon were operated by H.W. McGuirk, who also helped manage the mining company in Terlingua and funded the construction of a church. A post office was established at Lajitas in 1904 and remained in operation until 1939. McGuirk petitioned for it to be re-established when it was built sometime before 1901. It closed temporarily in 1910 and reopened six years later. He then sold the land to Thomas V. Skaggs, who became successful in the Lajitas Wax Company, which sold candelilla wax. Commerce was interrupted by Pancho Villa and his bandits, bringing John J. Pershing and his troops to establish a cavalry post there in 1916. A motel stood on the same land in the 1980s. The Lajitas area was then bought by Rex Ivey, Jr., who brought electricity to the community in 1949 and sold part of it to Walter M. Mischer, a Houston entrepreneur and owner of Mischer Corporation. He restored the community in 1976 with his corporation's subsidiary, Arrow Development Company. The population of Lajitas plummeted to only four when Terlingua's quicksilver mines closed. By the mid-1980s, Lajitas became a resort town with 15 businesses serving 50 people. The old church in the community was restored, and the community grew to have three motels, a hotel, a restaurant, a golf course, a swimming pool, an RV park, and an airstrip. The Lajitas Museum, which contained artifacts from the Big Bend area, was located just east of Lajitas. The old trading post also remained operational. The population remained at 50 in 1990 and grew to 75 from 2000 to 2010.

Starting in the 1980s as a joke, for many years the purported mayor of Lajitas was Clay Henry III, a "beer-drinking" goat. After two replacements of the original Clay Henry, the trading post and stable where the actual mayor lived is now closed and they goat no longer resides there. The election included incumbent human mayor Tommy Steele, as well as a trading post wooden Indian named Kevin Zinter, and a dog named Buster. Since Clay Henry, goats have been mayors of the community ever since.

Geography
Lajitas is located on the eastern end of the Big Bend Ranch State Park. It is located on a bluff overlooking the Rio Grande at San Carlos ford of the old Comanche Trail, in the northern part of the Chihuahuan Desert in southwestern Brewster County.

Columnar basalt that is similar to that of the Devils Postpile National Monument in California can be found in a high desert dry river falls area just north of Lajitas.

Climate
Lajitas has a hot arid climate with very hot summers and mild winters.

Economy
The Lajitas Golf Resort and Spa is a 20,000-acre golf resort business in Lajitas owned by Texas businessman Kelcy Warren, who bought the resort from previous owner Steve Smith while the business was going through financial distress. It is located on the Rio Grande, bordering Mexico, between Big Bend National Park and Big Bend Ranch State Park. The Robert E. Lee on Traveller statue is on display at the resort.

Education
Lajitas is zoned to schools in the Terlingua Common School District. Before that, Lajitas had a school with 50 students in 1912. H.W. McGuirk also funded the construction of a school.

Media
In the 1970s the community had one telephone, and newspapers were delivered one day later than their normal dates. Additionally, there were no televisions, the latter a rarity among communities in the decade.

Frank Q. Dobbs directed his first film, Enter the Devil, in Lajitas in 1972.

The TV miniseries, Streets of Laredo was also filmed in Lajitas. The community was said to be "about the only place where you can shoot 360 degrees", since Santa Fe and Sedona were already used up.

Infrastructure

Airport
Due to the remoteness of the resort, Lajitas is served by the Lajitas International Airport, a private airport with a  concrete runway.

Military bases
The 90th Fighter Squadron of the United States Army Border Air Patrol had a sector that traveled to Lajitas from Eagle Pass. The 11th Bomb Squadron operated from Marfa Field along the Rio Grande to El Paso.

In popular culture
Lajitas is mentioned extensively in Red Dirt/Texas Country artist Wade Bowen's song "Day of the Dead" recorded in October 2017. In The Three Burials of Melquiades Estrada, Pete and a coyote sit overlooking the Rio Grande near Lajitas.

References

External links
 Lajitas Golf Resort

Unincorporated communities in Brewster County, Texas
Unincorporated communities in Texas